"Remember (Walking in the Sand)", also known as "Remember", is a song written by George "Shadow" Morton. It was originally recorded by the girl group the Shangri-Las, who had a top five hit with it in 1964. A remake  by Aerosmith in 1979 was a minor hit. There have been many other versions of the song as well.

The Shangri-Las' version

Background
Morton was looking to break into the music business, and went to the Brill Building in New York City to see an old girlfriend, Ellie Greenwich, who had become a successful pop songwriter. Morton and Greenwich's writing partner, Jeff Barry, took a dislike to one another. Asked what he did for a living, Morton replied "I write songs", although he had never written one. When Barry asked him what kind, Morton retorted, "Hit songs!" Barry said he would love to hear one of Morton's tunes, and invited him to come back the following week with something.

Morton hired a teenage group from Queens, the Shangri-Las, to sing. Realizing that he did not have a song yet, he immediately wrote "Remember (Walking in the Sand)". There are several stories as to how it was written. One is that immediately upon his realization of not having a song, he parked next to a beach on Long Island and there wrote the song. The song contains recurring seagulls-and-surf sound effects. He used the Shangri-Las on the demo, which he himself produced. (A not-yet-famous Billy Joel is said by Morton to have played the piano chords that open the song.) Jeff Barry was impressed and Red Bird Records picked up the song for release and signed Morton and the Shangri-Las to contracts. According to some accounts, the original version was nearly seven minutes long. In order to fit the AM radio format of the time, the song had to be cut in length, but rather than edit it, Morton simply faded it out after 2:10. In another version Morton presents the demo to various Red Bird staffers, Jeff Barry, Ellie Greenwich, Artie Butler and others and they and some session musicians took the demo into the studio where it became, "a whole other record."

Reception
The song was released as the third single by the Shangri-Las, their first on Red Bird Records, and became a number five hit on the Billboard Hot 100, and number nine on the Cashbox R&B chart. It also hit number fourteen on the UK Singles Chart, and became more successful in the UK when reissued on several occasions in the 1970s.

Cash Box described it as "a hauntingly plaintive pop-r&b romancer with an off-beat rapidly-changing, hard-shufìiin' beat."

The Shangri-Las' recording placed #395 on Rolling Stones 500 Greatest Songs of All Time list in 2004. Billboard named the song #26 on their list of 100 Greatest Girl Group Songs of All Time.

In the early 1970s, Buddah Records released a "Radio Active Gold" oldies 45 containing an undubbed version of the demo (no echo or sound effects). This version is timed at 2:17, and the intro is the "Remember..." chorus without Mary Weiss' lead vocal. This version (the technical term for it is an underdub) first appeared on a 1969 Buddah compilation album entitled Incense and Oldies, along with an alternate version of "Give Him a Great Big Kiss".

Personnel

According to musicologist Albin J. Zak:

The Shangri-Las
Mary Weisslead vocal
Marge Ganserbacking vocal
Mary Ann Ganserbacking vocal
Betty Weissbacking vocal

Additional musicians and production
Unidentified session musiciansbass guitar, drums, piano
Unidentifiedfinger snaps, handclaps, sound effects
Brooks Arthurengineering
Jeff Barryproducer
Shadow Mortonproducer (uncredited)
Artie Rippproducer

Chart history

Weekly charts

Year-end charts

Aerosmith version

Background
Aerosmith released a more rock oriented version of the song featuring uncredited backing vocals by Mary Weiss of the Shangri-Las as a single in 1979. Released on Columbia Records it was taken from the group's sixth studio album Night in the Ruts and was also included on their Greatest Hits album. Aerosmith's cover was co-produced by Gary Lyons. It charted on the Billboard Hot 100 at number 67. It also peaked at number 29 on the Canadian RPM singles chart in March 1980.

Louise Goffin version
In 1979, Louise Goffin released a remake of the song on her debut album, Kid Blue. That version reached #43 on the Billboard Hot 100.

In popular culture
In 2005, American rapper Capone sampled the song and pitched it up 5 semitones for "Streets Favorite" (often mislabeled with the song title "Oh No"), a track from his 2005 album Pain, Time, & Glory. In 2020, the instrumental to "Streets Favorite" became an Internet meme on TikTok, typically being played when an accident is shown. The Capone sample was popularized in the BBC series Don't Mess!, and subsequently appeared in several marketing campaigns for the show between 2010 and 2015.

Amy Winehouse covered part of the pre-chorus when singing "Back to Black" during live shows.

Notes

References

Sources 

 
 
 

1964 songs
1964 singles
1979 singles
1980 singles
The Shangri-Las songs
The Beach Boys songs
Aerosmith songs
Columbia Records singles
Songs written by Shadow Morton
Red Bird Records singles
Internet memes introduced in 2020
Songs about nostalgia